The  is a national research institute in Japan. It was established in 1996 through the merger of the Institute of Population Problems (1939–) and the Social Development Research Institute (1965–). It is an affiliated institution of the Ministry of Health, Labour and Welfare.

During the period of dramatic economic growth following World War II, Japan's life-expectancy increased with fertility decreased. This has led to explosive growth in the cost of social security programs with a continuing decline in the workforce.

The mission of the IPSS is to collect accurate and detailed data regarding the current state of the Japanese population and its fertility rate and to produce highly accurate estimations of future trends based on careful scientific analyses perforated on that data. The IPSS also conducts research concerning social security policies and systems in Japan and abroad.

IPSS Statistics

See also 
 Welfare in Japan
 Demographics of Japan
 Aging of Japan

External links 
 National Institute of Population and Social Security Research Official Website

1996 establishments in Japan
Demographic economic problems
National Laboratories
National Laboratories